Music Lovers' Phonograph Monthly Review (PMR) was an American magazine for record enthusiasts founded in Jamaica Plain, Boston, by Axel B. Johnson. The first issue was dated October 1926 (Vol., no. 1) –  after the first issue of Gramophone, a similar magazine founded in London by Compton MacKenzie. As put by George Wilson Oman (1895–1947) – an Edinburgh-born Chicago-based telegraph operator and organizer of the Phonograph Art Society of Chicago – "This magazine is to the United States what the Gramophone is to Great Britain and bids fair in its splendidly edited pages to rival the Gramophone. The magazine ran for 66 issues – six and one-half years – ending March 1932 (Vol. 6, no. 6), under financial duress during the Great Depression. Although, the suspension of the April and May 1932 issues has been attributed to, according to Gramophone magazine, "a misfortune of which we have only just heard from an American reader." "He says that the Editor, Mr. Axel Johnson, was kidnapped late in March, 'robbed, beaten unconscious and thrown from a speeding ." PMR – through the succession of Music Lovers' Guide (1932–1935) and The American Music Lover (1935–1944) – is considered the forerunner to the American Record Guide.

History 
The magazine launch occurred (i)  after Columbia (May 1925) and (ii)  after Victor (November 2, 1925; "Victor Day") debuted their new systems – orthophonic (electrical) recording technology – electronically-amplified sound developed by Bell Labs-Western Electric in an effort to replace the limited properties of the acoustic recording horn. The mid-1920s was also the beginning of the Golden Age of Radio and prior to the introduction of the new technology, consumer demand for old-style phonographs waned in favor of radios.

Reviews of recordings were first published in 1906 in Berlin by Phonographische Zeitschrift (de); but, The Gramophone, in England, and the Phonograph Monthly Review, in North America, were the first non-record label periodicals that focused primarily on reviewing musical recordings.

In 1932, Axel B. Johnson and R.D. Darrell purchased the Music Lovers' Guide. The magazine ran monthly for 31 issues, from September 1932 (Vol. 1, no. 1) through March 1935 (Vol. 3, no. 7).

Phonograph Monthly Review (digitized online)

   
   
   
  
   
  
   
   
   
   
   
   
  
  
  
  
  
  
  
  
  
  
  
  
  
  
  
  
  
  
  
  
  
  
  
  
  
  
  
  
  
  
  

  
  
  
  
  

 
  
  
  
  
  
  

  
  
  
  

  
  
  

  
  
  
  

  

 
 
 

 The Google Books versions were digitized from originals held at the Stanford University Libraries
 The Internet Archive versions were uploaded in August 2016 by the National Recording Preservation Board

Editors and contributors

Bibliography

Annotations

Notes

References

 

 
  .
  .
  ; .

 
  

 

 

  

   (publication);  (article);  (article);  (article).

  ; ; ; ; ; .

  ; ; .
 
 

 

 

 

 

 

 

  ; ; .The author, David Hall, was the founding Editor of the ARSC Journal, and, from 1980 to 1982, President of the ARSC. He was the founding curator of recorded sound at the New York Public Library for the Performing Arts, which grew into a division known as the Rodgers and Hammerstein Sound Archives. He also had been a record critic for Stereo Review.

  ; ; .<div style="margin-left:6em">See Encyclopedia of Recorded Sound.
 
 

 
     
                 .
       
     
        (1947 re-print).
     
      
     
        .
      

   .

  .

 {{cite book |ref=
 

  ; ; .For 18 years, Lindahl was an Assistant Professor and Reference Librarian at the Eastman School of Music.

 
   ; .
  ; 

 

 

   .

   (publication);  (article);  (article);  (article).

 

  ; ; .

  .

  

  

  

 
  
  
 
 

 

 

 

  

  

  

  Note: Prescott, was responding to contributor, George Wilson Oman (1895–1947). Prescott, a recording pioneer on various levels, had been affiliated with International Zonophone Company, which incorporated in Jersey City March, 7, 1901. His brother, Frederick Marion Prescott became managing director and J.O., himself, was one of the shareholders.

  

Magazines established in 1926
Magazines disestablished in 1932
1926 establishments in Massachusetts
1932 disestablishments in Massachusetts
Jamaica Plain, Boston
Monthly magazines published in the United States
Classical music magazines
Music magazines published in the United States
Magazines published in Boston
Defunct magazines published in the United States
Music archives in the United States